Cross Game is an anime television series based on the manga series of the same name written and illustrated by Mitsuru Adachi and published by Shogakukan. The series is about the high school baseball players Ko Kitamura and Aoba Tsukishima and their attempts to fulfill the dream of Aoba's dead sister, Wakaba, of seeing them play in the national high school championship tournament in Koshien Stadium.

The anime adaptation is produced by SynergySP and directed by Osamu Sekita, with character designs by Yuuji Kondō and music by Kotaro Nakagawa. The series began broadcasting on the TV Tokyo network on 5 April 2009 in the 10:00–10:30 am slot; episodes began syndication later in April 2009 on AT-X and other channels in Japan, and finished airing with episode 50 on 28 March 2010. The first DVD volume of episodes 1–3 was released in Japan on 24 July 2009, with additional DVDs released monthly. Viz Media began streaming subtitled episodes of the Cross Game anime in North America in May 2010.

Six pieces of theme music were used in the series. "Summer Rain", written by Kentarō Kobuchi and sung by Kobukuro, was used as the opening theme song for all episodes. It was released by Lantis on 15 April 2009 in both regular and limited edition versions, and reached #2 on the Oricon singles chart. , composed and sung by Ayaka and arranged by Shintarō Tokita., was the ending theme song for episodes 1–13. It was released as a single by Lantis in both regular and limited edition versions on 22 April 2009, and reached #6 on the Oricon singles chart. , written and performed by Squarehood, was the ending theme for episodes 14–26. It was released as a single by Warner Music Japan on 5 August 2009. , by Tsuru, was the ending theme song for episodes 27–39. It was released as a single by Warner Music Japan on 11 November 2009. , by Natsuko Kondo, was the ending theme song for episodes 40–49. It was released by 725 RECORDS on Kondo's album on 11 November 2009. , also by Kondo, was the ending theme song for episode 50.

List of episodes

See also 
 List of Cross Game characters
 List of Cross Game chapters

References

External links 
 Cross Game anime official site 
 Cross Game anime official English site
 

Cross Game